Piotr Kocąb (born 11 September 1952) is a Polish football manager.

References

1952 births
Living people
Polish football managers
Hutnik Nowa Huta managers
Górnik Zabrze managers
MKS Cracovia managers
Przebój Wolbrom managers